Madarounfa  is a department of the Maradi Region in Niger. Its capital is Madarounfa. As of 2011, the department had a total population of 612,798 people.

References

Departments of Niger
Maradi Region